John Herbert McLaughlin  (1890–1973) was a Scottish footballer who played as an outside right.

In his first year at senior level with Hamilton Academical, he took part in the 1911 Scottish Cup Final, which Accies lost to Celtic after a replay. He also played for Morton before retiring during World War I to pursue his other profession of a dentist, although he returned to Hamilton for one season once the conflict had ended.

His father, also John Herbert McLaughlin, was a prominent figure in 19th-century Scottish football, serving as chairman of Celtic and president of both the Scottish Football Association and the Scottish Football League.

References

1890 births
1973 deaths
Footballers from Glasgow
Scottish people of Irish descent
Association football outside forwards
Scottish footballers
Scottish dentists
Blantyre Victoria F.C. players
Hamilton Academical F.C. players
Greenock Morton F.C. players
Strathclyde F.C. players
Scottish Football League players
Scottish Junior Football Association players
20th-century dentists